Men's triple jump events for blind & visually impaired athletes were held at the 2004 Summer Paralympics in the Athens Olympic Stadium. Events were held in two disability classes.

F11

The F11 event was won by Li Duan, representing .

26 Sept. 2004, 20:30

F12

The F12 event was won by Duan Qifeng, representing .

27 Sept. 2004, 09:00

References

M